Eric Gordon Hall    (12 October 1922 – 17 June 1998) was a Pakistani fighter and bomber pilot, and former Director-General of the Civil Aviation Authority (CAA). A two-star general in the Pakistan Air Force, Hall had served as the Vice Chief of Air Staff and was one of the most distinguished pilots belonging to the Christian minority who had participated in all of the major India−Pakistan wars, most notably the First Kashmir War, the Second Kashmir War and the Indo-Pakistani War of 1971. He had also served as the Director-General of the Pakistan Air Force's Air Force Science Research Laboratories (AFSRL) where he led atomic weapons research efforts as part of Pakistan's nuclear technology project.

Early life 
Hall was born on 12 October 1922 into a Christian Anglo-Burmese family in Rangoon, Burma, British India (present-day Myanmar). His father was a combat engineer in the British Army, and went missing in action during the Japanese invasion of Burma in 1941, shortly after which he was declared dead. Due to the Japanese invasion and outbreak of war in Burma, the women in Hall's family were airlifted to India while the men fled on foot. Arriving in Dibrugarh, Northeast India a few weeks later, Hall was hospitalized for a short time before he enlisted in the Royal Air Force and was subsequently deployed to Burma, where he flew sorties against Japanese forces as a Hawker Hurricane fighter pilot.

During the Partition of India in 1947, Hall opted for the new Dominion of Pakistan, shifting himself and his family to Lahore. He transferred his service to the Royal Pakistan Air Force, where he continued his military career.

Commands and diplomatic career
During his service in the Pakistan Air Force, Hall commanded a number of air bases and also served as the Commandant of the PAF Air War College. In 1960 and the early 1970s, Hall served as a defence and air attaché at the Embassy of Pakistan in Washington D.C.

Indo-Pakistani War of 1965 
Leading up to the outbreak of the Second Kashmir War between India and Pakistan in August 1965, Hall was in command of PAF Base Nur Khan in Chaklala, Rawalpindi as a Group Captain (Colonel). Knowing that war was imminent after the failure of the Pakistan Army's Operation Gibraltar in Jammu and Kashmir, he was conscious of the Pakistan Air Force's lack of specialist aircraft. Hall hit upon the idea of converting C-130 Hercules transporters into heavy bombers.

Having conducted trials to test and prove the converted bombers' efficiency, Hall volunteered to lead the first bombing mission over a strategically vital bridge in Kathua, Jammu and Kashmir on 11 September 1965. The mission was fraught with danger as the unarmoured transport-turned-bomber was highly vulnerable to Indian anti-aircraft guns. However, the mission's ultimately successful outcome prompted the Pakistani high command to authorize thirteen more strategic bombing runs with converted C-130s, including the precision striking of Indian heavy guns at Attari, on the banks of the BRB Canal. The success of these missions proved that Hall had hit the bullseye with his innovative idea, for which he was awarded the Sitara-e-Jurat by the Government of Pakistan in 1965.

Retirement and migration to the U.S.
Eric Hall sought to retire from his military service in 1977, immediately after the conduction of a successful U235 project. He received an honourable discharge from the Pakistan Air Force in 1978 and was made Director-General of the Civil Aviation Authority (CAA) for the Government of Pakistan, a position he would remain in until the early 1980s.

After seizing power in a coup d'état and establishing a military dictatorship, General Muhammad Zia-ul-Haq drafted a new version of the Constitution of Pakistan, and immediately began implementing aggressive Islamist policies. Due to these policies' scrutinization of religious minorities and rising intolerance in Muslim-majority Pakistan, Hall, a Christian, relocated to Maryland in the United States. Settling down in Gaithersburg, he founded Hall Enterprises, Inc. with his wife Marjorie in August 1982. The company engaged in the business of importing and exporting Pakistani furniture, giftware and military spare parts. Hall suffered from a stroke in June 1998, after which he died at Shady Grove Adventist Hospital in Rockville, Maryland at the age of 75—he is survived by his wife and two children.

References

|-

1922 births
1998 deaths
Royal Air Force pilots of World War II
Royal Air Force officers
Pakistan Air Force air marshals
Pakistani aviators
Pakistani people of Anglo-Burmese descent
Pilots of the Indo-Pakistani War of 1965
Recipients of Sitara-e-Jurat
Pakistani Christians
Project-706
Chiefs of Air Staff, Pakistan
Pakistani emigrants to the United States
Pakistani air attachés
British World War II fighter pilots